Century Estates, Alberta may refer to:

Century Estates, Alberta, a locality in Athabasca County, Alberta
Century Estates, Strathcona County, a locality in Strathcona County, Alberta